P94 may refer to:

 , a patrol boat of the Royal Australian Navy
 Papyrus 94, a biblical manuscript
 Ruger P94, a pistol
 Scania P94, a truck
 P94, a state regional road in Latvia